Jimmy Edgar is an American conceptual artist and sound designer from Detroit, Michigan. Influenced by minimalism, Yves Klein and Immaterialism, early in their career Jimmy released two hip-hop glitch albums under the names Michaux and Kristuit Salu and Morris Nightingale. Their first solo album Color Strip (2006) came out on Warp Records after they signed to the label at age 18. This release was followed by XXX (2010) on !K7 Records in 2010. After their last solo LP Majenta (2012), Jimmy has released several EPS on Jimmys own imprint New Reality Now, often designing the album covers with Pilar Zeta.

Jimmy is an active conceptual and generative artist in the fine art NFT community.

Early life
James "Jimmy" Edgar was born in Detroit, Michigan and grew up in Roseville, Michigan. Raised in Detroit, Jimmy developed an early interest in music and learned multiple instruments at a young age, including string instruments, saxophone, and percussion/drum set. He had learned songwriting and piano from several musicians he met at Baptist churches in Detroit. Experimenting with electronic music by age ten, and then started performing at Detroit raves by age fifteen. As a teenager, he had also began playing the drums in experimental bands and making tape recordings. Most of these recordings, consisting mainly of pitch bent tape loops, tape splicing, field recordings, and noise tracks, were the beginning of their experimentation with the technical aspects of production.

Art career

2021-present
Jimmy's first NFT artwork titled 'DROOL OF VENUS' was sold on March 17, 2021 on Foundation. Their work spans conceptual ideas, generative digital works & 3D animations. His artwork UNREAL, which sold for 2.441 Ethereum, was a single majenta pixel. Works that followed included OBSOLETE, the black anodized Dyson vacuum cleaner.

In 2022, Jimmy released OBJECTZ, a collection of 3396 images. Each artwork is a "unique digital construction", generated in a web browser. The website states "the process is performed by Javascript and features the iconic elements of JIMMY’s artwork."

Zora states "Edgar first began experimenting with generative processes in his originating project, OPTIONZ. He states that it was inspired by generative process: having a bunch of layers, throwing it into a program, randomizing it, and seeing what comes out the other end."

Music career

2004–08: Warp EPs and Color Strip

Jimmy’s first release on Warp Records was the 2004 4-track EP Access Rhythm, which had a more "hip-hop sound" than his previous albums.  Access Rhythm was shortly followed by the 6-track EP Bounce Make Model, which according to Allmusic, "first crystallized the erotic electro-funk sound for which [Edgar] would become well known." After touring in support of the two EPs, Edgar began working on their debut with Warp, a process that would take him two years. According to Edgar, their goal with the album was to "capture the essence of Detroit." It was made using software Edgar had customized by self, then recorded to analog tape. They released the full-length album as Color Strip in February 2006, to a positive critical reception. Allmusic called it "breathtakingly original," praising the album's "sleazy urban feel that combined techno, electro, R&B, glitch, and hip-hop influences." Pitchfork Media wrote in a review that "Edgar comes across as a committed student, absorbing twenty-five years of electronic music and figuring out how to integrate and mold the history into something that sits comfortably in the now."

2010–12: XXX and Majenta

Edgar's solo album XXX came out June 2010 on K7 Records. Andy Kellman of Allmusic wrote that Edgar's increased use of analog equipment in the recording process "refines his smutty neo-electro." Around that time Edgar continued to tour internationally, notably in cities such as Tokyo, Zagreb, Istanbul, Athens, Tallinn, Moscow, Turin, London, and Berlin. In 2012, Edgar released the solo album Majenta, on Hotflush Recordings. In a positive review of Majenta for the BBC, Rich Handscomb focused on the erotic element of the sounds, also writing that "As difficult as it is to take Edgar seriously at times, so earnest is he about his sexualised sonic seercraft that resistance is futile."

2012–14: JETS and Ultramajic

Edgar and Machinedrum released an eponymous EP in 2012 as the group J-E-T-S, and they also toured in support of the material, playing a number of major festivals. As a solo artist, as of 2014 Edgar has performed at festivals such as Bang Face, I Love Techno, and two appearances at the Movement Festival (DEMF). In late 2013 he continued to be based in Berlin, though he soon began working out of Los Angeles as well.

Edgar founded the record label Ultramajic with artist Pilar Zeta in 2013. His first EP on Ultramajic was Hot Inside, and the lead single's music video was featured on THUMP in late 2013. In May 2014, he was brought in by the BBC to create an Essential Mix, focusing on the theme of "Ultramajic doing Detroit radio circa 1993." As of early 2014 Ultramajic had released over a dozen albums in the electronic genre, with both Zeta and Edgar designing most album covers.

In 2014, Resident Advisor released RA Podcast: RA.401 which was produced by Jimmy. The mix spanned 90 minutes and went through a meticulous recording process including mastering, cut onto 6 dubplate vinyl discs, digitally pasted together and remastered.

2015–18: Production
In 2016, Jimmy Edgar released "Dreamz Come True" featuring Toronto R&B artist Rochelle Jordan. In 2017, after a chance meeting with longtime friend SOPHIE, he began production on Vince Staples album Big Fish Theory and produced the single "745". In 2018, Jimmy released a single under his own name called "Burn So Deep" featuring Dawn Richard.

NFT

Artworks
OBJECTZ collection (2022)
OBSOLETE collection (2022)
OPTIONZ collection (2022)
BLEED (2022)
RIZE (2022)
DOWN ONLY (2022)
PLUSH (2021)
MIRRORZ (2021)
HARDWARE (2021)
BLUE DREAM (2021)
NONVOID (2021)
META (2021)
ELEVATE (2021)
IMMORTAL (2021)
BABBLE ON (2021)
GUMMY (2021)
UNIMAGINE (2021)
UNSEEN (2021)
SCAN UNREALITY (2021)
UNREAL (2021)
BUNNY (2021)
MASC (2021)
COLLAPZE (2021)
OBSERVVVER (2021)
SCAN RELIC (2021)
HEAD IN THOUGHTS (2021)
WOOO UNREAL (2021)
FRIENDS OF TECHNOLOGY (2021)
DROOL OF VENUS (2021)

Discography

Production
Theophilus London – Higher ft. Jesse Boykins III (2009)
Theophilus London – Blindfolded (2008)
Vince Staples – 745 (2017)
Farrah Fawx – Never Thought [Co-produced with KLSH] (2017)
BANKS – Sawzall [Addition production] (2019)
Tanerelle – A Trip Through Space to Clear My Mind [Co-produced with Machinedrum] (2019)
J-E-T-S – COME ALIVE ft. Theophilus London [Co-produced with Machinedrum] (2019)
J-E-T-S – SLIMEBALL ft. Zack Slime Fr [Co-produced with Machinedrum] (2019)
J-E-T-S – ATTUNE ft. Roses Gabor [Co-produced with Machinedrum] (2019)
Kidd Kenn – Shake Sum ft. Cupcakke [Additional production by SOPHIE] (2020)
Kidd Kenn – FWTN (2020)
B La B – Who I Be (2020)
Bloody Jay – Trenches ft. Slim 400 (2020)
Bloody Jay – Secrets (2020)
Adamn Killa – Its Halloween (2020)
OG MACO – Commas ft. B La B (2020)
Nia Kay – Bankroll (2020)
Big Baby Scumbag – Jimmy (2021)
Big Mali – Hey Mali (2021)
Hoodrich Pablo Juan, Jose Guapo – Can't Stand It (2021)
Millie Go Lightly, Landstrip Chip – Wraith (2022)
Chynna – centerfold (2022)
Lady Gaga – Babylon (featuring Jimmy Edgar & Bree Runway) (2022)
MILK – What Are We (2022)

Albums
2006: Color Strip (Warp Records)
2010: XXX (!K7 Records)
2012: Majenta
2021: Cheetah Bend

EPs

Singles

Further reading
Interviews and articles

Discographies
Jimmy Edgar at Allmusic
Jimmy Edgar at Discogs

See also
Detroit techno

References

External links

JimmyEdgar.com
Jimmy Edgar at Discogs
Jimmy Edgar on YouTube

1983 births
American male songwriters
American multi-instrumentalists
Record producers from Michigan
American electronic musicians
American techno musicians
Ambient musicians
Intelligent dance musicians
Living people
Remixers
Musicians from Detroit
Hotflush Recordings artists
21st-century American male singers
21st-century American singers